Lina Ingeborg Thomsgård (born 3 May 1978 in Stockholm) is a Swedish columnist, DJ, and PR consultant. She is the founder of Rättviseförmedlingen.

She participated in the 2014–15 season of På spåret together with musician Jason Diakité.

References

Swedish public relations people
1978 births
Living people
Swedish women writers
Swedish columnists
Swedish women columnists